There were 15 bowling events at the 2010 South American Games.

Medal summary

Medal table

Medalists

 
Bowling
South American Games
2010